The Academy of Clinical Laboratory Physicians and Scientists is a learned society for scientists in the fields of clinical pathology and laboratory medicine. It was founded on November 12, 1966, in Bethesda, Maryland by a group of fifty-one individuals, led by David Seligson, Jon
Straumfjord, George Z. Williams, Ernest Cotlove, and Ellis Benson. The society's founding mission was to represent scientists in the fields of clinical pathology and laboratory medicine in both the United States and Canada. As of 2015, it had 295 active members, as well as an additional 127 associate members, 195 emeritus members, and 5 honorary members. Along with the American Society for Clinical Pathology, it co-sponsors the American Journal of Clinical Pathology.

References

External links
 

Clinical pathology
Pathology organizations
Organizations established in 1966
1966 establishments in Maryland
Medical associations based in the United States